Omar Cortés (born 14 June 1977) is a Spanish former gymnast. He finished 26th in the all around at the 2000 Summer Olympics.

References

External links
 

1977 births
Living people
Spanish male artistic gymnasts
Olympic gymnasts of Spain
Gymnasts at the 2000 Summer Olympics
Gymnasts from Madrid